The Lutz is a figure skating jump, named after Alois Lutz, an Austrian skater who performed it in 1913. It is a toepick-assisted jump with an entrance from a back outside edge and landing on the back outside edge of the opposite foot. It is the most difficult jump and the second-most famous jump after the Axel.

History
The Lutz jump is the second-most difficult jump in figure skating and "probably the second-most famous jump after the Axel". It is named after figure skater Alois Lutz from Vienna, Austria, who first performed it in 1913. In competitions, points are awarded based on the number of rotations completed during the jump. The base value of a successful single Lutz is 0.60, a double Lutz 2.10, a triple Lutz 5.90; and a quadruple Lutz 11.50.

Firsts

Execution

The ISU defines the Lutz jump as "a toe-pick assisted jump with an entrance from a back outside edge and landing on the back outside edge of the opposite foot". Skaters tend to go into it with a long, diagonal take-off into one of the corners of the rink. It is a difficult jump because it is counter-rotational, which means that the skater sets it up by twisting in one way and jumping in the other. Many skaters "cheat" the jump because they are not strong enough to maintain the counter-rotational edge, resulting in taking off from the wrong edge. A "cheated" Lutz jump without an outside edge is called a "flutz".

References

Works cited
 * "ISU Figure Skating Media Guide 2018/19" (22 September 2022). (Media Guide) International Skating Union. Retrieved 9 October 2022.

Figure skating elements
Jumping sports